KCTU-LD, virtual channel 5 (UHF digital channel 23), is a low-powered This TV-affiliated television station licensed to Wichita, Kansas, United States. The station is owned by River City Broadcasters, Inc. KCTU-LD's studios are located on Water Street in Wichita's Midtown neighborhood, and its transmitter is located atop 250 Douglas Place in downtown.

It was one of four low-powered channels in the United States to distribute RT America (Russia Today), which received funding from the Russian government and was accused of promoting Russian propaganda. The U.S. State Department has declared that Russian media outlets RT and Sputnik are "critical elements in Russia's disinformation and propaganda ecosystem." RT America ceased operations in March 2022 during Russia's invasion of Ukraine; KCTU replaced the network with France 24. It is also one of a few over-the-air stations that carry Infowars, the largely deplatformed fringe/far-right conspiracy channel operated by Alex Jones.

History

The station first signed on the air in 1992. On February 1, 1998, KCTU became the first commercial television station in the world to stream its programming online 24 hours a day to reach more viewers. In 2001, KCTU affiliated with Pax TV (now Ion Television). Because of the local programming and other network affiliations carried by the station (including a secondary affiliation with Urban America Television that lasted until that network's shutdown in May 2006), the station did not air as many infomercials as most Pax/i/Ion affiliates. The station dropped the network in 2008.

On May 10, 2007, the principal owners of KCTU through N&H Publishing Corp. announced the acquisition of the Wichita City Paper. Planned topics are similar to those featured on the local programs seen on the station including local and consumer news, religious topics and veterans' issues. The local television program guide that was formerly featured as an insert in The Prospector, also began appearing in the City Paper.

In August 2010, the station became affiliated with Estrella TV, a Hispanic network. By June 2011, KCTU primary subchannel was pick up by AT&T U-verse.

Ron and Sheryl Nutt, owners, placed the station up for sale in July 2012 with a July 22 deadline for offers.

In late July 2013, TV Scout was added as the station's fourth subchannel with some initial formatting glitches.

Cable carriage
As it is a low-powered station, KCTU is not carried on Cox Communications as it is not obligated to carry KCTU under "must-carry" regulations as those rules do not currently apply to low-power stations. According to KCTU, the station presented the provider with a petition from 6,000 Cox subscribers and community leaders to carry the station. Cox refused to give KCTU channel space for free. According to KCTU, Cox increased their lease fee to $70,264 per month. This has led KCTU to encourage Cox subscribers to keep demanding that it carry the station, and to watch KCTU's programming over-the-air and on the internet. On June 28, 2011, AT&T U-verse began to carry KCTU on channel 43; the provider had previously carried all the Wichita–Hutchinson market's other low-power stations.

Local programming
In addition to its various network programming, the station also produces some local public affairs programming, including the news and interview program Your Hour which airs weekdays at noon. A female-oriented talk show called Mouthy Broads airs Wednesdays at 6 p.m. The station also broadcasts a religious service from Wichita's Riverside Christian Church each Sunday at 9 a.m.

The station previously fielded a news department, headed for a number of years by R.J. Dickens and produced hour-long newscasts at 4 p.m. during the early 2000s. That program was reduced by a half-hour and aired at 4:30 between 2004 and 2005. The last regular news broadcast aired March 3, 2005 though news segments have appeared over the years, primarily as an insert during Your Hour. The news department also produced Spanish-language newscasts and updates for KSMI-LP during the time they were affiliated with Azteca América under River City ownership.

KCTU also had produced a program called The River City Forum with permanent hosts each weeknight and rotating fill-in hosts.

KCTU was nominated for a Heartland Emmy Award for Best Dayside Newscast in 2005, reportedly the first such nomination for an English-language low-power station in a Nielsen Top 160 market. The station received a second nomination in 2010 for news graphics.

Each holiday season, starting Thanksgiving night and running through Christmas Eve, the station airs the early 1980s-era version of Santa's Workshop—a long running Wichita TV program featuring Henry Harvey as Santa.

Subchannels
The station's digital signal is multiplexed:

References

External links

CTU-LD
Television channels and stations established in 1992
1992 establishments in Kansas
Low-power television stations in the United States
This TV affiliates
NewsNet affiliates
The Country Network affiliates
Classic Reruns TV affiliates